Carlos Guimarães (born 28 February 1898 - deceased), former Portuguese footballer who played as goalkeeper.

External links 
 

1898 births
Portuguese footballers
Association football goalkeepers
Portugal international footballers
Year of death missing